Takyeh Dowlat ( lit. "State Theater") was a Royal Theater in Tehran, Iran. It was the most famous of all the ta'zieh performance spaces, for the Mourning of Muharram. It has a capacity for more than 4,000 people. Built in 1868  by Naser al-Din Shah Qajar south-east of the Golestan Palace on the site of the Síyáh-Chál, the Royal Theater's sumptuous magnificence surpassed that of Europe's greatest opera houses in the opinion of many Western visitors. It is comparable to Verona Arena, Samuel Greene Wheeler Benjamin told at his first visit.

Karim Pirnia has introduced Hossein-Ali Mehrin as the architect of this building.

Notable events
It was here that Reza Shah proclaimed the downfall of the Qajar dynasty. The Tekyeh was destroyed in 1947 and a bank building was constructed on the site.

Gallery

References

Takyehs
Buildings and structures in Tehran
Amphitheaters
Theatres in Iran
Demolished buildings and structures in Iran
Buildings and structures demolished in 1947